Human: The Double Album is the seventh studio album and second major label album by American country music singer Cody Johnson. It was released in October 2021 via Warner Music Nashville. The album contains eighteen tracks on two separate discs. The lead single from the album is "'Til You Can't".

Content
Johnson was inspired to write songs about the rodeo after the commercial success of "Dear Rodeo", a duet with Reba McEntire. He sought songwriters that, according to Billboard, were "familiar with the song structures and styles of songwriting popular with ‘90s country music." In advance of the album's release, "'Til You Can't" was selected as the lead single and was released to country radio in October 2021.

Critical reception
Rating it 4 out of 5 stars, Stephen Thomas Erlewine wrote for AllMusic that "Johnson's emotional facility helps enliven a record that sticks to straight-ahead red dirt country, an album that doesn't deviate from familiar country tropes yet stays fresh thanks to Johnson's unfussy, unhurried execution."

Track listing

Personnel
Ingrid Andress – background vocals (track 9)
Jody Bartula – fiddle (tracks 3, 12, 17, 18), background vocals (tracks 3, 6, 8, 13, 18)
Todd Boswell – bagpipes (track 9)
Jackson Bragg – background vocals (track 13)
Mike Brignardello – bass guitar (tracks 1, 2, 5, 6, 9, 10, 13, 16)
Dale Brigsby – featured vocals (track 17)
Jim "Moose" Brown – B-3 organ (tracks 2, 4, 7, 10–13), keyboards (tracks 4, 7, 10, 11, 13, 14), piano (tracks 2, 9), synthesizer (tracks 2, 4, 7, 10, 11, 13, 14)
Scott Brown – background vocals (track 13)
Jack Clarke – acoustic guitar (track 4)
Perry Coleman – background vocals (tracks 4, 5, 10, 16)
Mark Fain – upright bass (track 15)
Jeneé Fleenor – fiddle (tracks 1, 2, 4–7, 11, 13–16), strings (tracks 1, 14)
Kylie Frey – background vocals (tracks 1, 2, 12)
Jim Gray – bagpipes (track 9)
Cody Johnson – acoustic guitar (tracks 2, 3, 7, 8, 11, 12, 15, 17, 18), lead vocals (all tracks), background vocals (track 15)
Mike Johnson – steel guitar (tracks 1, 2, 4–7, 16)
Joel Key – acoustic guitar (tracks 1, 2, 4–7, 10, 11, 13, 14, 16), banjo (track 15), mandolin (track 15)
Jeff King – acoustic guitar (tracks 2, 4, 13, 14), electric guitar (tracks 5–7, 9, 13, 14)
Ned LeDoux – featured vocals (track 17)
Corb Lund – featured vocals (track 17)
Gayle Mayes – background vocals (tracks 5, 10, 18)
Amber White McDonough – background vocals (track 14)
Jake Mears – banjo (track 8), electric guitar (tracks 3, 8, 12, 17, 18), background vocals (tracks 3, 4, 6, 8, 13, 18)
Willie Nelson – acoustic guitar (track 3), featured vocals (track 3)
Justin Ostrander – electric guitar (tracks 1, 2, 4–7, 9–11, 13–16)
Steve Patrick – background vocals (track 13)
Angela Primm – background vocals (tracks 5, 10, 18)
Brian Pruitt – drums (tracks 9, 10, 13–15)
Joey Pruski – bass guitar (tracks 3, 8, 12, 17, 18), background vocals (track 13)
Noe Quintanilla – background vocals (track 13)
Mickey Raphael – harmonica (track 3)
Jerry Roe – drums (tracks 1, 2, 4–7, 11, 16)
Matt Rogers – background vocals (track 7)
Clint Rorie – background vocals (track 13)
Jason Kyle Saetveit – background vocals (tracks 13, 14, 16)
Scotty Sanders – dobro (track 15), steel guitar (tracks 9–11, 13, 14)
Adam Shoenfeld – electric guitar (tracks 1, 2, 4, 5, 7, 9–11, 13–16)
Jimmie Lee Sloas – bass guitar (tracks 4, 7, 11, 14)
Red Steagall – featured vocals (track 17)
Miles Stone – drums (tracks 3, 8, 12, 17, 18), background vocals (track 13)
Rhonda Vincent – background vocals (track 14)
Trent Willmon – background vocals (tracks 1, 2, 14–18)
Alex Wright – B-3 organ (tracks 5, 6, 16), keyboards (track 16), piano (tracks 1, 5, 6), synthesizer (tracks 1, 16)
Harrison Yount – steel guitar (tracks 3, 8, 12, 17, 18), background vocals (track 13)

Charts

Weekly charts

Year-end charts

References

2021 albums
Cody Johnson albums
Warner Records albums